The Riyadh Street Circuit is a street circuit located in the capital of Saudi Arabia, used for the Ad Diriyah ePrix of the FIA Formula E Championship. It held its first race on 15 December 2018, as the opening race of the 2018-19 FIA Formula E Championship.

History 
In May 2018, ahead of the 2018 Berlin ePrix, it was announced that Formula E holdings had signed a deal with the Saudi Arabian government, for a race to be held in the outskirts of the Saudi Arabian capital of Riyadh, in the Ad Diriyah district for 10 years.

Track Layout 

Before the 2021 race, the track was revised and resurfaced with reprofiling Turn 9, 13, 18, 19; and moving the start straight before the Turn 18.

Lap records 

The official race lap records at the Riyadh Street Circuit are listed as:

References 

Formula E circuits
Sport in Riyadh
Riyadh